Ihor Cherednichenko (born 9 May 1984) is a Ukrainian professional footballer.

In 2016, he played for Helios Kharkiv.

External links
 

1984 births
Living people
Footballers from Kharkiv
Ukrainian footballers
Ukrainian expatriate footballers
Association football defenders
Expatriate footballers in Belarus
Ukrainian expatriate sportspeople in Belarus
FC Metalist Kharkiv players
FC Metalist-2 Kharkiv players
FC Oleksandriya players
FC Torpedo-BelAZ Zhodino players
FC Zirka Kropyvnytskyi players
FC Hirnyk Kryvyi Rih players
FC Helios Kharkiv players
FC Metalist 1925 Kharkiv players
FC Polissya Zhytomyr players
FC Viktoriya Mykolaivka players
Ukrainian Premier League players
Ukrainian First League players
Ukrainian Second League players
Ukrainian Amateur Football Championship players